Kitchie Nadal is the self-titled debut studio album by Filipino singer-songwriter Kitchie Nadal, released in the Philippines in 2004 by Warner Music and 12Stone Records. The album's second single, "Huwag na Huwag Mong Sasabihin", became the most-played OPM single in 2004 and later earned her numerous awards. It was also used as theme song to ABS-CBN's Philippine broadcast of popular Korean TV series Lovers in Paris. The album was peaked at number one in the Philippine Top 10 Albums chart.

Background and writing
After leaving her band MOJOFLY in 2003 after doing two albums with the group, Nadal pursued a solo recording career under Be.Live Artist Management. When asked if she still hangs out with her ex-bandmates—who, according to speculations, were quite disappointed with her abrupt decision—she admitted she still communicates with Ricci Gurango yet not on a regular basis. On the reason why she left Mojofly, she only answered "Mojofly kasi was more of a Ricci band. I only sing songs."

In late 2003, she signed a contract with Warner Music Philippines and became associated with other best-selling talents of the label including Nina, Christian Bautista and Paolo Santos. On writing songs in the album, Nadal admitted on being out-spoken. One best example is the song "Bulong". The album's direction and sound reflects to her spiritual life, saying "Gumagawa ako ng mga songs na parang mga panaginip, parang ini-interpret ko kung paano ako managinip, hindi masyadong malinaw pero, may visual. [I make songs that are like dreams, it's like I interpret what I dream of, it's not that clear but it's visual.] The carrier single, Run, started playing on the radio in mid-2003.

Reception

Critical response
Paolo Quiazon of Titik Pilipino gave the album three and a half out of five stars, saying "Unless you've been living under a rock, you have probably already heard the (arguably) most overplayed song in the country for the past year: Kitchie Nadal's "Huwag na Huwag Mong Sasabihin." He admits that the song is the catchiest in the album, but it doesn't really tell how the rest of the album sounds. He praised Nadal's songwriting skills, stating "Kitchie Nadal is a deeply personal songwriter, driven by faith and belief – at least on this album. Her reflective wordings play on the foreground of her straightforward musical backdrop. She talks about God, Jesus, salvation, sacrifice and a few other things along the same line. This makes for well thought lyrics, and combined with good music, makes for great songs."

Commercial performance
The album is considered as one of the best-selling albums in the Philippines, selling over 214,800 units in the country. To date, it has been certified 7× Platinum by the Philippine Association of the Record Industry (PARI).

Track listing

Standard edition

Special limited edition
Disc 1 Bonus tracks

Disc 2 VCD
 "Run" (music video)
 "Huwag na Huwag Mong Sasabihin..." (music video)
 "Bulong!!!" (music video)
 "Same Ground" (Piano version) (music video)
 Video clips of gigs (Jam in Japan)

Personnel
Kitchie Nadal - Vocals
Aaron Cambronero - Bass
Jeff De Castro - electric & acoustic guitar
Marco Guzman - Drums

Additional Musicians:
Vic Mercado - Drums (Fire)
Bagets - Drums (Run)
Rommel de la Cruz - Bass (Deliverance/Run)
Jack Rufo - Additional Instruments

Album credits
Executive Producers: Tommy Tanchanco and Roca Cruz
Album Lay Out & Design: Mon Olega, Roca Cruz & Kitchie Nadal
Imaging: efish
Photographer: Iman Mntalvan
Make Up Artists: Angela Montalvan
Stylist: Amazing Grace Ministry of Style, Meryl Chavez

Charts

Certifications

References

2004 debut albums
Kitchie Nadal albums